is a district located in Fukui Prefecture, Japan.

As of 2003, the district had an estimated population of 18,680 and a density of 133.18 persons per km2. The total area is 140.26 km2.

Towns and villages
The district has two towns:

 Ōi
 Takahama

History

Recent mergers
 On March 3, 2006 - The village of Natashō (from Onyū District) was merged into the expanded town of Ōi.

Districts in Fukui Prefecture